Rachele Baldi (born 2 October 1994) is an Italian footballer who plays as a goalkeeper for the Italian club Roma after moving to the club on 21 July 2020. She previously played for Empoli.

Club career 
Baldi spent the first 9 years of her senior football career playing within her home region of Tuscany, among various clubs in the area. She openly wrote on her emotional ties to Empoli when she decided to leave Tuscany in 2020. After speculating on moving to play football abroad in a foreign league, Baldi decided to stay in Italy and move to Roma.

During Baldi's first season with Roma, she struggled to impose herself as a first-team regular at the club. Baldi made just 9 league appearances in the 2020–21 Serie A season, keeping an 11.1% clean sheet percentage in the league.

On 30 May 2021, Baldi received a Coppa Italia winner's medal after Roma won the trophy by beating AC Milan in the final.

References 

1994 births
Living people
Italian women's footballers
People from Prato
Women's association football goalkeepers
Serie A (women's football) players
A.S. Roma (women) players
Footballers from Tuscany
Florentia San Gimignano S.S.D. players
Sportspeople from the Province of Prato